Laguna de Calderas is a crater lake in the municipality of Amatitlán, Guatemala, Guatemala. It is located approximately 6 km south of Lake Amatitlán and 3 km north of the currently active vent of the Pacaya volcano. The lake has a surface area of 11 ha and is situated at an altitude of 1778 m.

References

Calderas
Calderas
Calderas
Geography of the Guatemala Department